Formosa Magazine, also known as Mei-li-tao, was a magazine created by Tangwai individuals in Taiwan during the summer of 1979.  It opposed the Kuomintang's political monopoly in the Republic of China government. A police raid of the Formosa Press caused the Kaohsiung Incident in December 1979.

There were 61 participants; less than ten were truly active, namely,
 Huang Hsin-chieh, publisher
 Chang Chun-hung, chief editor
 Shih Ming-teh, general manager
 Hsu Hsin-liang, editor
 Annette Lu, editor
 Lin Yi-hsiung, circulation manager
 Yao Chia-wen, circulation controller

The opening celebration took place in Mandarina Crown Hotel (中泰賓館) in the afternoon of 8 September 1979. A blockade by the military ensued, sometimes known as the Mandarina Crown Hotel Incident. For the next three months until the raid, branches were opened throughout Taiwan. Opening were followed by speeches and conferences.

References

External links

 
 
 

1979 establishments in Taiwan
1979 disestablishments in Taiwan
Chinese-language magazines
Defunct magazines published in Taiwan
Defunct political magazines
Magazines established in 1979
Magazines disestablished in 1979
Magazines published in Taiwan
Monthly magazines
Taiwanization
Taiwan independence movement